Nyx puyaphaga is a moth of the family Choreutidae. It is known from central Chile.

The length of the forewings is 3.8-4.5 mm. Adults are on wing from November to December.

The larvae feed on Puya alpestris. The female genitalia clearly show that the eggs must be inserted into the host plant, since the ovipositor is extremely stout and sharply pointed.  It is not known into which part of the plant the egg is inserted or on what part the larva actually feeds.

References

Millieriidae
Endemic fauna of Chile
Moths described in 1982